Tansholpan Jumadilova (born 18 July 1998) is a Kazakhstani handball player for Kazygurt Handball and the Kazakhstani national team.

She represented Kazakhstan at the 2019 World Women's Handball Championship.

References

1998 births
Living people
Kazakhstani female handball players
20th-century Kazakhstani women
21st-century Kazakhstani women